Tennis was among the sports contested at the 2019 Southeast Asian Games and held at the Rizal Memorial Tennis Center in Manila. Five events were featured for tennis namely: men's singles, women's singles, men's doubles, women's doubles and mixed doubles.

Medalists

Medal table

References

External links
 

2019
Southeast Asian Games 2019
2019 Southeast Asian Games events
Southeast Asian Games